49er & 49er FX South American Championships are annual South American Championship sailing regattas in the 49er and the 49er FX classes organised by the International 49er Class Association.

Editions

Medalists

49er

49er FX

References

49er competitions
49er FX competitions
Central and South American championships in sailing